Insinger can refer to:

 Insinger, Saskatchewan, an unincorporated community in Saskatchewan, Canada
 Insinger de Beaufort, an Anglo-Dutch private bank
 Insinger Papyrus, an ancient Egyptian papyrus

 Harris Insinger, an American race car driver
 Rural Municipality of Insinger No. 275, a rural municipality in Saskatchewan, Canada